Live at Knebworth, also known as Live Summer 2003 with different cover text, is a live album by English pop singer Robbie Williams, recorded and released in 2003. The album is his first live album, and is a compilation of songs performed during three consecutive shows at Knebworth, England on 1–3 August 2003.

The three shows attracted a total of 375,000 fans, becoming the "biggest music event in British history". It is the second fastest and biggest selling live album ever in the United Kingdom behind Williams' former band Take That's live album The Greatest Day – Take That Present: The Circus Live. It has been certified 2× Platinum by the IFPI for sales over 2 million copies.

The DVD released of that Summer's three performances at Knebworth Park was entitled What We Did Last Summer, a reference to the film I Know What You Did Last Summer. It went on to sell 350,000 in the United Kingdom. In Australia, the DVD went on to sell 165,000 copies, 25,000 more than the actual album.

Williams' former Take That bandmate Mark Owen was invited to perform "Back for Good" on stage with him at Knebworth. This was the first time the two had performed together since the band split in 1996. After performing with Williams, Owen returned to the spotlight, signing a deal with Island/Universal Records.

Track listing
"Let Me Entertain You" – 5:54
"Let Love Be Your Energy" – 4:46
"We Will Rock You" – 1:18
"Monsoon" – 5:11
"Come Undone" – 5:34
"Me and My Monkey" – 7:20
"Hot Fudge" – 5:44
"Mr. Bojangles" – 5:26
"She's the One" – 5:43
"Kids" – 7:22
"Better Man" – 2:12
"Nan's Song" – 4:50
"Feel" – 5:16
"Angels" – 5:56

Pregaps
Between-song banter and various mini-songs can be found between some of the songs on the album in pregaps:
Robbie Williams talking to the audience (0:41, between tracks 4 and 5)
Robbie Williams talking to the audience (0:37, between tracks 5 and 6)
Robbie Williams introducing "Hot Fudge" (0:06, between tracks 6 and 7)
Robbie Williams introducing Max Beesley whilst singing a little song about him (1:35, between tracks 7 and 8)
Robbie Williams talking to Max Beesley whilst Beesley plays a song on piano (1:21, between tracks 8 & 9)
Robbie Williams talking to the audience (1:20, between tracks 9 and 10)
Robbie Williams singing a song about Knebworth and his mother (1:10, between tracks 10 and 11)
Robbie Williams introducing "Nan's Song" (0:18, between tracks 11 and 12)
Robbie Williams introducing "Feel" (1:31, between tracks 12 and 13)
Robbie Williams introducing "Angels" (0:44, between tracks 13 and 14)

Singles
In Mexico and Argentina, EMI Music sent a promotional CD to radio stations featuring "Feel" and "Angels" live from the show.

Personnel
 Max Beesley: percussion, piano
 Dave Bishop: flute, saxophone
 Yolanda Charles: bass guitar
 Melvin Duffy: slide guitar
 Simon Gardner: trumpet
 Katie Kissoon: background vocals
 Tessa Niles: background vocals
 Gary Nuttall: guitar, background vocals
 Mark Plati: guitar, keyboards, background vocals
 Chris Sharrock: drums
 J. Neil Sidwell: trombone
 Steve Sidwell: trumpet
 Paul Spong: trumpet
 Neil Taylor: guitar, background vocals
 Chris White: flute, saxophone
 Robbie Williams: vocals
 Claire Worrall: guitar, keyboards

Charts

Weekly charts

Year-end charts

Certifications

DVD release

Concert track listing
The album was recorded in three evenings in Knebworth and then cut. The set lists for the three performances were:

Set lists

References

Robbie Williams albums
2003 live albums
Knebworth